Suman or budbud is a rice cake originating in the Philippines. It is made from glutinous rice cooked in coconut milk, often wrapped in banana leaves, coconut leaves, or buli or buri palm (Corypha) leaves for steaming. It is usually eaten sprinkled with sugar or laden with latik. A widespread variant of suman uses cassava instead of glutinous rice.

Varieties
There are numerous varieties of suman, with almost every town or locality having its speciality. Some are described below:

Binuo (or Suman sa Binuo) – A rare variety of suman, the glutinous rice is soaked, milled, mixed with coconut milk and sugar, wrapped in the leaves of the Tagbak plant, and steamed. The leaves give this variety of suman a uniquely balmy, minty flavor, and the suman itself is chewier than the whole-rice varieties.

Kurukod or kurukud - A type of cassava suman with a filling of sweetened grated coconut (bukayo).

Palagsing - A local variety of suman from Butuan using unaw starch, or sago. It bears a characteristically red color and has a sweeter taste.

Suman sa Ibus (or simply Ibus) – A ubiquitous variety of suman in the Philippines, the glutinous rice is washed, and is then mixed with salt and coconut milk. The mixture is poured over pre-made coil containers of young palm leaves called Ibus or Ibos, and fixed with the leaf's central shaft. This is then steamed using water mixed with "luyang dilaw" (turmeric)—giving it that distinctly yellow colour—and served either with a mixture of shredded coconut and sugar, or latik (reduce coconut milk until white lumps form and simmer until golden brown).

Sumang Inantala – The ingredients are similar to the Ibus variety, but the Inantala differs in that the mixture itself is cooked, and then poured over a small square mat cut from banana leaves.

Sumang Kamoteng Kahoy – Cassava is finely ground, mixed with coconut milk, sugar, wrapped in banana leaves, and steamed.

Suman sa Lihiya – Soaked glutinous rice mixed with coconut milk is treated with lye, wrapped in banana leaves, and boiled for two hours. It is served especially with either of two varieties of latik—the brown one which has been darkened with extended cooking, and has a stronger coconut flavor or the white one which is more delicate. Also known as Akap-akap from the way it is bundled and sold; it is usually sold in pairs, hence the name.

Sumang Inilonggo – Refers to Biko in Hiligaynon/Ilonggo as opposed to the traditional suman.

Other names
It is known as marcha in India, Nepal and Bhutan, benh men in Vietnam, chiu, chu or daque in China and Taiwan, loogpang in Thailand, ragi in Indonesia and nuruk in Korea.

Suman wrapping
Suman wrapping is a unique art in itself, and can be traced to pre-colonial roots which have had contact with Indian traditions. Wrappers utilize a wide variety of indigenous materials such as palm, banana, anahaw and bamboo leaves, coconut shells, and others. Others are in vertical coils like the inantala, giving it a tubular form. Still others are in pyramid-like shapes, like the balisungsong. Some forms of suman are eaten like ice cream–with cones made from banana leaves, and still others are in very complex geometric patterns like the pusu ("heart"). Some are woven into the shape of a banana blossom (which in the Philippines is referred to as the banana plant's "heart"), or the pinagi (from the word pagi, meaning stingray), a complex octahedral star.

Suman dishes (as well as savory variants like binalot and pastil) are differentiated from pusô (or patupat), in that the latter use woven palm leaves.

Gallery

See also
Pusô
Tupig
 Espasol 
 Kakanin
 Kalamay
 Moron
 Puto
 Sapin-sapin
 Piutu
 Lepet
 List of steamed foods

References

Philippine rice dishes
Thai rice dishes
Vietnamese rice dishes
Indonesian rice dishes
Indian rice dishes
Nepalese cuisine
Bhutanese cuisine
Taiwanese rice dishes
Chinese rice dishes
Korean rice dishes
Foods containing coconut
Philippine desserts
Glutinous rice dishes
Steamed foods
Rice cakes